The Armenia national under-21 football team is the youth football team of Armenia. The team is based mostly on the young players from the league and competes every two years in order to qualify for the European Under-21 Football Championship. The team played its first match in 1994, Armenia having until 1992 been part of the USSR.

UEFA U-21 record 
 1978 - 1991: part of USSR
 1992 - 1994: did not participate
 1996: 6th of 6 in qualification group.
 1998: 5th of 5 in qualification group.
 2000: 5th of 5 in qualification group.
 2002: 5th of 6 in qualification group.
 2004: 5th of 5 in qualification group.
 2006: 6th of 6 in qualification group.
 2007: 2nd of 3 in qualification group.
 2009: 4th of 5 in qualification group.
 2011: 4th of 6 in qualification group.
 2013: 2nd of 5 in qualification group.
 2015: 4th of 5 in qualification group.
 2017: 6th of 6 in qualification group.
 2019: 4th of 6 in qualification group.

Managers 
Oganes Zanazanyan
Samvel Petrosyan - From September 1994-
Armen Gyulbudaghyants
Andranik Adamyan
Mihai Stoica - From 2003-August 2004
Vardan Minasyan - From August 2004 – 2007
Varuzhan Sukiasyan
Flemming Serritslev - From March 2009-September 2010
Rafael Nazaryan - From 2011- October 22, 2013
Abraham Khashmanyan - October 22, 2013 - November 30, 2014
Sargis Hovsepyan - December 1, 2014 - June 5, 2015
Artak Oseyan - June 6, 2015 - November 26, 2015
Karen Barseghyan - January 12, 2016 - June 30, 2017
Artur Voskanyan - May 1, 2017 - June 30, 2018
Armen Gyulbudaghyants - July 1, 2018 - October 6, 2018
Antonio Jesus Flores - May 1, 2019 - 2020 
Rafael Nazaryan - 2020 -

Players

Current squad 
 The following players were called up for the 2023 UEFA European Under-21 Championship qualification.
 Match dates: 2, 6 and 12 June 2022
 Opposition: ,  and 
 Caps and goals correct as of:''' 29 March 2022, after the match against

Recent call-ups
Players that have been called up within the past 12 months and are eligible for the 2021 European U21 Football Championship Qualifiers.

UEFA Euro U-21 qualification

2023 UEFA European Under-21 Championship qualification Group H

Standings

See also

Armenia national football team
Armenia national under-19 football team
Armenia national under-17 football team

References

External links
 Uefa Under-21 website Contains fixtures and results

European national under-21 association football teams
Youth football in Armenia
Armenia national youth football team